Nabokov's Quartet is a collection of four of Vladimir Nabokov's short stories. The collection was first published by Phaedra, New York in 1966. It contains the following short stories:
 "An Affair of Honor"
 "Lik"
 "The Vane Sisters"
 "The Visit to the Museum"

The latter two were reprinted in 1968 in Nabokov's Congeries, and "Lik" and "The Vane Sisters" are included in Tyrants Destroyed and Other Stories (1975). All four stories were published again posthumously within The Stories of Vladimir Nabokov.

Short story collections by Vladimir Nabokov
1966 short story collections